Stylaria is a genus of annelids belonging to the family Naididae.

The genus has almost cosmopolitan distribution.

Species:
 Stylaria fossularis Leidy, 1852 
 Stylaria lacustris Linnaeus, 1758

References

Naididae